Inada is a Japanese surname. Notable people with the surname include:

, Japanese figure skater
}, Japanese economist
Koji Inada (disambiguation), multiple people
Lawson Fusao Inada (born 1938), American poet, fifth poet laureate of the Oregon
, Japanese skeleton racer
, lieutenant general in the Japanese Imperial Army during World War II
, the pen-name of a Japanese psychiatrist, writer and literary critic
, Japanese baseball player
, Japanese former swimmer who competed in the Olympic games
, Japanese physician, a prominent academic, and bacteriologist researcher
, Japanese official and politician
, Japanese voice actor who works for Aoni Production
, Japanese politician of the Liberal Democratic Party
, Japanese sport shooter

See also
Family Inada (Inada) is a Japanese manufacturer of robotic massage chairs
Inada conditions, assumptions about the shape of a production function that guarantee the stability of an economic growth path
Inada Station, a railway station on the Mito Line in Kasama, Ibaraki, Japan
Inadan (disambiguation)
Inanda (disambiguation)

Japanese-language surnames